Michal Divíšek (born April 22, 1976) is a Czech former professional ice hockey defenceman.

Divísek began his career with Stadion Hradec Králové and played one game for the team during the 1993–94 Czech Extraliga season. He then moved to North America to play in the junior Canadian Hockey League system, where he was drafted 26th overall by the Western Hockey League's Seattle Thunderbirds in the 1994 CHL Import Draft.

After two seasons in the WHL, Divíšek returned to the Czech Extraliga and played 249 regular season games over the next seven seasons, playing for HC Vsetín, HC Dukla Jihlava, HC Karlovy Vary, HC Pardubice, HC Litvínov, HC Havířov Panthers and HC Plzeň. He would also play in France's Ligue Magnus for Diables Rouges de Briançon and Diables Noirs de Tours.

Since 2008, Divíšek has worked as a coach in France, beginning with a player-coach role at Peaux Rouges d'Evry in France's third-tier FFHG Division 2. He retired in 2010 and became an assistant coach for Aigles de Nice of Division 1. In 2018, he became head coach for Division 3 side Ducs de Dijon.

References

External links

1976 births
Living people
Czech ice hockey coaches
Czech ice hockey defencemen
Diables Noirs de Tours players
Diables Rouges de Briançon players
HC Dukla Jihlava players
HC Dynamo Pardubice players
HC Havířov players
HC Karlovy Vary players
HC Litvínov players
People from Hořice
HC Plzeň players
Seattle Thunderbirds players
Stadion Hradec Králové players
VHK Vsetín players
Sportspeople from the Hradec Králové Region
Czech expatriate ice hockey players in the United States
Czech expatriate sportspeople in France
Czech expatriate sportspeople in Italy
Expatriate ice hockey players in France
Expatriate ice hockey players in Italy